Mabel Rose Wilson (1883–1962) was a notable New Zealand domestic worker and community leader. She was born in Southbridge, North Canterbury, New Zealand in 1883.

References

1883 births
1962 deaths
People from Southbridge, New Zealand